Erotissimo is a 1969 French-Italian comedy film directed by Gérard Pirès. It was entered into the 19th Berlin International Film Festival.

Cast
 Annie Girardot as Annie
 Jean Yanne as Philippe
 Francis Blanche as Le polyvalent (Tax controller)
 Dominique Maurin as Bernard
 Didi Perego as Chantal
 Erna Schürer as Sylvie
 Venantino Venantini as Sylvio
 Jacques Higelin as Bob
 Rufus as The Accountant
 Uta Taeger as Jeanne
 Louisa Colpeyn as La mère d'Annie / Mother (as Luisa Colpeyn)
 Nicole Croisille as Florence
 Serge Gainsbourg as L'individu louche / Confusing guy
 Daniel Prévost as The seller
 Jacques Martin as The seller
 Anne-Marie Peysson as La femme qui lit 'La Croix'

References

External links

1969 films
1969 comedy films
French comedy films
Italian comedy films
1960s French-language films
Films directed by Gérard Pirès
1960s French films
1960s Italian films